Nezih Ali Boloğlu (born 4 August 1964 in Istanbul) is a retired Turkish footballer. He played as a goalkeeper.

Football career
After retiring as a player, Nezih joined Galatasaray's coaching staff, and worked with the goalkeepers.

References

External links
Profile at Galatasaray.org

1964 births
Living people
Footballers from Istanbul
Association football goalkeepers
Süper Lig players
Sarıyer S.K. footballers
Gençlerbirliği S.K. footballers
Galatasaray S.K. footballers
Eskişehirspor footballers
Bakırköyspor footballers
Turkish footballers
Galatasaray S.K. (football) non-playing staff